Maia Basket Clube is a professional basketball team based in Maia, Portugal.

The club was founded in the 1997–98 season, by Dr. Vieira de Carvalho in order to bring a basketball team to the city of Maia.

Notable players
 Nuno Marçal

References

External links
Official website

Basketball teams in Portugal
Basketball teams established in 1997